The 1974 Chicago Bears season was their 55th regular season completed in the National Football League. The team finished with a 4–10 record, which led to the ouster of Abe Gibron as head coach.

Offseason

NFL Draft

Roster

Regular season

Schedule

Game summaries

Week 1: vs. Detroit Lions 
Gary Huff hit Charlie Wade with two long passes, one from 73 yards and another from 43, setting up Chicago touchdowns that beat Detroit. Carl Garrett ran in from one yard for the Bears first touchdown and Huff threw a nine-yard touchdown pass for a 14–0 lead. It would be though the high mark for the Bears that season.

Week 6: vs. Green Bay Packers 

 Source: Pro-Football-Reference.com

Standings

Awards and records

References 

Chicago Bears
Chicago Bears seasons
Chicago Bears